Riepen Park is a suburb of Johannesburg, South Africa. It is located in Region F of the City of Johannesburg Metropolitan Municipality. The street postal code is 2196.

References

Johannesburg Region F